The 1971 Louisiana Tech Bulldogs football team was an American football team that represented Louisiana Tech University as a member of the Southland Conference during the 1971 NCAA College Division football season. In their fifth year under head coach Maxie Lambright, the team compiled a 9–2 record, were Southland Conference champion, and defeated Eastern Michigan in the Pioneer Bowl.

Schedule

References

Louisiana Tech
Louisiana Tech Bulldogs football seasons
Southland Conference football champion seasons
Pioneer Bowl champion seasons
Louisiana Tech Bulldogs football